Lynk & Co 03 is a compact sedan manufactured by Chinese-Swedish automaker Lynk & Co as the sedan version of Lynk & Co 02. The Lynk & Co 03 sedan went on sale in October 2018.

Overview

The Lynk & Co 03 went on sale in October 2018 and was designed mechanically similar to Lynk & Co 02, which is also based on the Compact Modular Architecture platform.

Lynk & Co 03 made its first appearance in September 2018 during the Chengdu Auto Show in China. The new car provides engine options including a 156 hp 1.5 liter turbo, a 180 hp 1.5 liter turbo, and a 190 hp 2.0 liter turbo, gearbox available are a 6-speed manual transmission and a 7-speed dual-clutch transmission. It sells between 116,800 and 151,800 RMB in China.

In June 2019, the performance version Lynk & Co 03+ was launched powered by a 2-liter turbocharged petrol engine with a power output of 254 hp and 350 Nm. In August 2021, a special edition called the Lynk & Co 03+ Cyan Edition was launched. The 03+ Cyan Edition is fitted with a turbocharged 2.0-liter engine producing 261 hp (195 kW / 265 PS) and 380 Nm (280 lb-ft) of torque matching the performance of the 05+ fastback crossover SUV. Power is sent to all four wheels through an 8-speed automatic transmission capable of a 0-100 km/h (0-62 mph) acceleration in 5.7 seconds.

2023MY facelift 
The Lynk & Co 03 facelift made its market debut in China in September 2022, featuring significantly redesigned exterior and interior. The facelift 03 has 254 hp and a starting price of 21,700 USD. In terms of driving assist systems, the facelift 03 got 25 autonomous driving sensors, including 12 ultrasonic radars and 5 mm radars. Qualcomm 8155 chips power the autonomous driving system of the Lynk & Co 03. The powertrain of the facelift model features a 2-liter turbocharged engine developing 215 hp (160 kW / 218 PS) in the entry-level model, and 251 hp (187 kW / 254 PS) with 350 Nm in the mid-spec pairing with a 7-speed DCT. As for the facelift 03+, it will be powered by a 262 hp (195 kW / 265 PS) engine, all-wheel drive, and transmission is an 8AT.

Motorsport 

The 03 is took part in the 2019 World Touring Car Cup with the car being built by Cyan Racing according to the TCR regulations. Thed Björk, Yann Ehrlacher, Yvan Muller and Andy Priaulx are scheduled to compete with the 03 TCR.

On 21 November 2020, at the Guia Race of Macau, Ma Qing Hua, driving for Shell Teamwork Lynk & Co Motorsport, finished second in the qualifying race of the 2020 TCR China Touring Car Championship season finale, securing the drivers’ title.

References 

02
Sports sedans
Sport compact cars
Front-wheel-drive vehicles
All-wheel-drive vehicles
Cars of China
Cars introduced in 2018
2010s cars